Rupela nivea is a moth in the family Crambidae. It was described by Francis Walker in 1863. It is found in Panama, Brazil (Paraná, Pará) and Argentina.

The wingspan is 24–37 mm. The wings are pure white.

References

Moths described in 1863
Schoenobiinae